Barry Lather (born August 16, 1966 in Albany, New York) is an American creative director, choreographer, producer, and dancer based in Minneapolis, Minnesota and Los Angeles, California.

Early life
Lather was born on August 16, 1966 in Albany, New York. He grew up in a family of five children in Atlanta, Georgia. His mother Joan was a dance instructor and his father George ran a dancewear business. In 1985, after graduating high school, Lather moved to Los Angeles and trained on scholarship at Joe Tremaine's Dance Center.

Career
Lather's first entertainment industry dancing project was the 1985 Michael Jackson 3-D film Captain EO. He continued performing in TV series like Fame and Dancin' to the Hits, commercials, and music videos such as Janet Jackson's "Nasty" and "When I Think of You." In 1987, Lather choreographed for Janet Jackson for the American Music Awards and Grammy Awards, and later for "The Pleasure Principle" music video, which won a Billboard Music Award and an MTV Award for Best Choreography. Other artists he worked choreography for included Prince, Michael Jackson, Paula Abdul, George Michael, Sting, and Sheryl Crow. In 1998, he choreographed the Super Bowl XXII Halftime Show and The Academy Awards.
 
Lather also recorded an album as a solo artist with the label Atlantic Records/WEA in 1990, titled Turn Me Loose.

In the early 2000s, Lather began directing large productions such as world tours and live television performances for artists including P Diddy,  Ashlee Simpson, Seal, Gwen Stefani, Ciara, Mariah Carey and Rihanna. He acted as creative director for Usher's The Truth Tour, The OMG Tour and for many other superstar artists. Lather's ice show production choreography includes shows for Paramount Parks and Disney and working with Olympic athletes like Kristi Yamaguchi, Scott Hamilton, and Katarina Witt. In late 2008, Lather directed and choreographed Donny and Marie Osmond's Las Vegas Show at the Flamingo Hotel. In 2010, he directed Usher's performances on So You Think You Can Dance, Britain's Got Talent, X Factor, and the BET Awards 2010.

In 2011 and 2012, he worked on the Freestyle Motocross show "Nuclear Cowboyz" tour. In 2014, he was creative director for performances by Echosmith, Nick Jonas, The Vamps, and Meghan Trainor at the Nickelodeon Halo Awards. For the 2016 Grammys, Lather directed Carrie Underwood and Sam Hunt's live mashup performance of "Heartbeat" and "Take Your Time." In early 2018, Lather directed the Qiddiya opening ceremony event in Saudi Arabia.  In 2019, Barry was the creative producer for American Idol's season finale show.   In 2021, he directed a Celebrity Cruise Line classic rock production called Rockumentary that launched in Greece.  Barry directed Robbie Williams Las Vegas Residency Show at The Wynn, and Carrie Underwood's Residency Show "Reflection" at ResortsWorld in Vegas.  Recently, Barry worked on Hans Zimmer's European Tour in 2022 and directed Carrie Underwood's The Denim & Rhinestones Tour.

Personal life

Awards

Selected Directing & Choreography

TV and Film
 1992: Roundhouse (3 seasons)
 1993: Super Mario Bros.
 1995: Michael Jackson: One Night Only HBO Special
 1996: Michael Jackson's Ghosts 1996: 68th Academy Awards 1997: Vegas Vacation 1997: Melinda: First Lady of Magic 1998: Blues Brothers 2000 2000-2018: Miss America Pageant 2000-2001: Nikki (7 episodes)
 2002: Death to Smoochy 2002: Unconditional Love 1998-2002: The Drew Carey Show (2 episodes)
 2008: Good Girl Gone Bad Live Rihanna
 2009: TV Special Jennifer Hudson
 2012: Duets (1 season)
 2014: Nickelodeon HALO Awards''
 2019: American Idol Season Finale (Creative Producer)
 2021: Carrie Underwood Live from the Ryman
 2022: American Idol (Creative Producer)

Music videos
 1987: "The Pleasure Principle" - Janet Jackson
 1987: "We'll Be Together" - Sting
 1987: "Diamonds" - Herb Alpert
 1988: "Kiss" - Tom Jones
 1989: "Electric Youth" - Debbie Gibson
 1989: "Batdance" - Prince
 1992: "Jam" - Michael Jackson
 1992: "My Destiny" - Lionel Richie
 1995: "Crazy Cool" - Paula Abdul
 1996: "If It Makes You Happy" - Sheryl Crow
 1996: "The Only Thing That Looks Good on Me Is You" - Bryan Adams
 1996: "Let's Make a Night to Remember" - Bryan Adams

Live Performances & Award Shows
 1987: 29th Annual Grammy Awards (Janet Jackson)
 1987: American Music Awards (Janet Jackson)
 1998: Super Bowl Halftime Special / Tribute to Motown
 2003: MTV Video Music Awards (P Diddy)
 2004: BET Awards (Usher)
 2004: MTV Video Music Awards (Usher)
 2004: American Music Awards (Usher & Alicia Keys)
 2005: Fashion Rocks (Gwen Stefani, Pharrell, P. Diddy)
 2007: BET Awards - (Ciara)
 2008: BET Awards, American Music Awards, Fashion Rocks (Rihanna)
 2008: BET Awards (Usher)
 2008: Donny & Marie Osmond Las Vegas Residency Show at the Flamingo
 2009: BET Awards (Keri Hilson)
 2010: MTV Video Music Awards (Usher "OMG" performance)
 2011-2015: Country Music Awards (Carrie Underwood, Blake Shelton, Luke Bryan, Kenny Chesney)
 2011: 2011 Latin Grammy Awards (Usher, Romeo Santos) 
 2011: American Music Awards (Justin Bieber)
 2011: American Idol performance (Nicole Scherzinger)
 2012: Divas (Ciara)
 2012-13: BET Award performances (Miguel)
 2013: Grammy Awards (Miguel & Wiz Khalifa)
 2013: Dancing with the Stars performance (Demi Lovato)
 2013: Billboard Awards (Miguel)
 2015: Kid's Choice Awards (Nick Jonas)
 2015: CMT Awards (Carrie Underwood)
 2016: ACMs, CMA, CMT Award performances (Carrie Underwood)
 2017: BET Awards (Trey Songz)
 2018: 2018 Radio Disney Music Awards (Carrie Underwood)
 2018: "Qiddiya" Live Opening Ceremony in Saudi Arabia
 2018: MTV Video Music Awards (Logic)
 2018: ACMs, CMT Fest, CMA, American Music Awards - (Carrie Underwood)
 2019: Robbie Williams "Live in Las Vegas" Residency show at The Wynn  
 2019: British Summer Time Hyde Park - Robbie Williams
 2019: Nu Skin Corporate Event 
 2019: "Diriyah" Opening Ceremony Event in Saudi Arabia 
 2020: "Rockumentary" -  Live Show / Celebrity Cruises
 2021: American Music Awards - (Jason Aldean & Carrie Underwood)
 2021: "Reflection" Las Vegas Residency Show at Resortsworld - Carrie Underwood  
 2021: Gala Live Event Las Vegas / Volo Events
 2022: Stagecoach - (Carrie Underwood)
 2022: Gala Live Event Los Angeles & Malta / Volo Events

Tours
 1988-1989: The Faith Tour - George Michael
 1991: Under My Spell Tour - Paula Abdul
 2001-2002: Dream Within a Dream Tour - Britney Spears
 2004: The Truth Tour - Usher
 2006: PCD World Tour - The Pussycat Dolls
 2006: The Emancipation of MiMi Tour - Mariah Carey
 2006: L.O.V.E. Tour - Ashlee Simpson 
 2007: Dancing with the Stars Tour
 2007: Girl Gone Bad Tour - Rihanna
 2010: OMG Tour - Usher
 2012: John Fogerty Tour
 2012: Kaleidoscope Dream Tour - Miguel
 2014: The Elusive Chanteuse Tour - Mariah Carey
 2014: John Fogerty 1969 Tour 
 2015: Jackie Tour - Ciara
 2015: Between the Sheets Tour - Trey Songz
 2016: The Storyteller Tour - Carrie Underwood
 2017: The Total Package Tour - Paula Abdul
 2019: Straight Up Paula Tour - Paula Abdul
 2019: The Cry Pretty Tour 360 - Carrie Underwood
 2022: Hans Zimmer European Tour 
 2022: The Denim & Rhinestones Tour - Carrie Underwood

References

External links
 

1966 births
Living people
American choreographers
American male dancers
Atlantic Records artists
People from Stillwater, Minnesota
Film choreographers